Koçaşlıi is a small village in Gülnar district of Mersin Province, Turkey. At  it is situated to the north of Turkish state highway . The population of the village was 64.

References

Villages in Gülnar District